Scorpiops tibetanus is a species of scorpion in the Scorpiopidae family, first found in Tibet, China.

References

Further reading
Di, Zhi-Yong, et al. "The first record of the family Euscorpiidae (Arachnida: Scorpiones) from Central China, with a key of Chinese species of the genus Scorpiops." Euscorpius 2011.118 (2011): 1-9.

Arthropods of China
Fauna of Tibet

Animals described in 1911